Rubén Soberón (26 June 1909 – 7 September 1999) was a Guatemalan fencer. He competed in the individual foil and épée events at the 1952 Summer Olympics.

References

External links
 

1909 births
1999 deaths
Guatemalan male épée fencers
Olympic fencers of Guatemala
Fencers at the 1952 Summer Olympics
Guatemalan male foil fencers